Kilmaine or Kilmain is a barony and village in County Mayo, Ireland.

Village

"Kilmaine", derived from the Irish language 'Cill Mheán', means The Middle Church – 'Cill' is the word used in the Irish language for a church, and 'meán' is the Irish word for middle. The village is located on the N84 road between Shrule and Ballinrobe.  The hinterland is entirely rural, made up of farms and scattered houses. The nearest town is Ballinrobe, and the closest city is Galway, roughly 40 kilometers (24 miles) away.

The village of Kilmaine had a population of 147 at the 2016 Census. The village has a post office, a petrol station, two shops four pubs, a church, school, a Garda (police) station. It also has a Gaelic Athletic Association pitch.

Transport 
The village lies on the N84 road that links Galway to Castlebar (Irish: Caisleán an Bharraigh) . A bus service that runs four days a week between Galway and Ballina passes through Kilmaine and also travels through Castlebar.

Sport 

The local Gaelic Athletic Association club, Kilmaine GAA, was founded on 9 March 1937. The first competitive game ever played by a Kilmaine team was against Castlegar (Claremorris), in Curran's field.  A local boxing club sometimes runs in the community centre.

Kilmaine barony
Civil parishes in the barony
Ballinchalla
Ballinrobe
Cong
Kilcommon
Kilmainebeg
Kilmainemore
Kilmolara
Moorgagagh
Shrule

Towns and villages in the barony
Ballinrobe
Cong
Hollymount
Kilmaine
Roundfort
Shrule
The Neale

See also

 List of towns and villages in Ireland
 Charles Edward Jennings de Kilmaine

References

History of County Mayo
Towns and villages in County Mayo
Baronies of County Mayo
Articles on towns and villages in Ireland possibly missing Irish place names